Leeds, England is the third most populous city in the United Kingdom.

Population

Leeds's total population, according to the 2011 UK census, was 751,485. The population density was 1,388 people per square km.

Ethnicity

The following table shows the ethnic group of respondents in the 2001 and 2011 censuses in Leeds.

Notes for table above

Languages

The most common main languages spoken in Leeds according to the 2011 census are shown below.

Religion

The following table shows the religion of respondents in recent censuses in Leeds.

See also

Demography of West Yorkshire
Demography of the United Kingdom
Demography of England
Demography of London
Demography of Birmingham
Demography of Greater Manchester
List of English cities by population
List of English districts by population
List of English districts and their ethnic composition
List of English districts by area
List of English districts by population density

References

Leeds
Leeds